Bad Golf My Way is a 1994 video by actor Leslie Nielsen. It is the sequel to his first golf video Bad Golf Made Easier and was followed by Stupid Little Golf Video in 1997.

Like its predecessor, Bad Golf is a parody of golf and other golf videos and books. This time, Nielsen drives a heel golfer crazy.

Sequel
Stupid Little Golf Video was the third and final film. However, Rick Friedberg was replaced as director by producer Peter Hayman. , it is the only one that has been released on DVD. Nielsen's wife Barberee Earl Nielsen makes a cameo as a lady golfer.

References

External links
 
 
 

1994 comedy films
1990s parody films
1994 films
American comedy films
Direct-to-video comedy films
1990s English-language films
Golf films
Films directed by Rick Friedberg
1990s American films